Ammonium aluminium sulfate, also known as ammonium alum or just alum (though there are many different substances also called "alum"), is a white crystalline double sulfate usually encountered as the dodecahydrate, formula (NH4)Al(SO4)2·12H2O. It is used in small amounts in a variety of niche applications. The dodecahydrate occurs naturally as the rare mineral tschermigite.

Production and basic properties
Ammonium alum is made from aluminium hydroxide, sulfuric acid and ammonium sulfate. It forms a solid solution with potassium alum. Pyrolysis leaves alumina. Such alumina is used in the production of grinding powders and as precursors to synthetic gems.

Uses
Ammonium alum is not a major industrial chemical or a particularly useful laboratory reagent, but it is cheap and effective, which invites many niche applications. It is used in water purification, in vegetable glues, in porcelain cements, in deodorants and in tanning, dyeing and in fireproofing textiles. The pH of the solution resulting from the topical application of ammonium alum with perspiration is typically in the slightly acid range, from 3 to 5.

Ammonium alum is a common ingredient in animal repellent sprays.

References

Aluminium compounds
Ammonium compounds
Sulfates
Double salts
Astringent flavors
E-number additives